Step Up is a studio album by Tower of Power on Mack Avenue Records. It was recorded over the course of the 2010s, and was released on March 20, 2020. This album is the last Tower of Power album to feature lead vocalists Ray Greene and Marcus Scott, and is also the last album to feature legendary bassist Francis Rocco Prestia before his death a few months later.

Track listing
 "East Bay, All the Way!" (Garibaldi, Prestia, Smith, Cortez) - 0:54
 "Step Up" (Castillo, Smith) - 5:10
 "The Story of You and I" (Castillo, Kupka) - 4:48
 "Who Would Have Thought" (Kupka, Nick Lane, Lamont Van Hook) - 3:58
 "Addicted to You" (Castillo, Sydney Justin) - 4:45
 "Look in My Eyes" (Prestia, Thomas William Schuman, Kevin Henry Whalum) - 3:45
 "You da One" (Prestia, Thomas William Schuman, Sennie Rudolph Martin) - 4:23
 "Sleeping with You Baby" (Castillo, Kupka) - 5:43
 "If It's Tea Give Me Coffee" (Kupka, William Ross) - 3:16
 "Beyond My Wildest Dreams" (Bruce Conte) - 3:22
 "Any Excuse Will Do" (Castillo, Kupka, Lenny Pickett) - 4:43
 "If You Wanna Be a Winner" – 3:22 (Castillo, Garibaldi, Prestia, Smith, Cortez) - 3:22
 "Let's Celebrate Our Love" (Castillo, Mark Dolin) 4:26
 "East Bay! Oaktown All the Way!" (Garibaldi, Prestia, Smith, Cortez) - 1:08

Personnel
 Emilio Castillo - bandleader, second tenor saxophone, lead vocals (on "Look In My Eyes" and "Any Excuse Will Do"), background vocals
 Stephen "Doc" Kupka - baritone saxophone
 Francis Rocco Prestia - bass guitar
 David Garibaldi - drums
 Roger Smith - keyboards, Hammond B3 organ, lead vocals (on "You da One")
 Jerry Cortez - guitars, background vocals, electric sitar (on "Who Would Have Thought?")
 Tom E. Politzer - first tenor saxophone, alto saxophone (on "The Story of You and I" and "Any Excuse Will Do")
 Adolfo Acosta - second trumpet, flugelhorn
 Sal Cracchiolo - first trumpet, flugelhorn
 Marcus Scott - lead vocals (on "The Story of You and I", "Sleeping With You Baby", and "Let's Celebrate Our Love"), background vocals
 Ray Greene - lead vocals (on "Step Up", "Who Would Have Thought?", "Addicted To You", "If It's Tea Give Me Coffee", "Beyond My Wildest Dreams", and "If You Wanna Be a Winner"), background vocals, trombone
 Joe Vannelli - keyboards, auxiliary percussion, vibes, marimba
 Chuck Hansen - bass saxophone (on "If You Wanna Be a Winner")
 Leah Meux - background vocals
 Tiwana Porter - background vocals
 Melanie Jackson - background vocals
 Dave Eskridge - horn and string arrangements

References

Tower of Power albums
2020 albums